Upson County Courthouse is a historic courthouse in Thomaston, Georgia, the county seat of Upson County, Georgia. It was built in 1908 at a cost of $50,000 in the Neoclassical style.  It uses cream-colored brick and has Ionic brick columns with high bases.  It has a three-stage clock tower.  Segmental arched windows alternate with rectangular ones.

It was extensively renovated in 1968 and was added to the National Register of Historic Places on September 18, 1980. It is located in Courthouse Square.

See also
National Register of Historic Places listings in Upson County, Georgia

References

External links
 

County courthouses in Georgia (U.S. state)
Courthouses on the National Register of Historic Places in Georgia (U.S. state)
Government buildings completed in 1908
Buildings and structures in Upson County, Georgia
1908 establishments in Georgia (U.S. state)